Koblek is a small settlement in the Municipality of Vojnik in eastern Slovenia. The area is part of the traditional region of Styria. It is now included in the Savinja Statistical Region.

References

External links
Koblek at Geopedia

Populated places in the Municipality of Vojnik